Shehnaaz Gill (born 27 January 1993 or 1994), also known as Shehnaaz Kaur Gill, is an Indian actress, model and singer who works in Punjabi  and Hindi  television and films. She began her modelling career with the 2015 music video Shiv Di Kitaab. In 2017, she debuted as an actress in the Punjabi film Sat Shri Akaal England. In 2019, Gill participated in the reality show Bigg Boss 13, where she finished in third place.

Early life
Gill was born on 27 January 1993 or 1994 and raised in Punjab, India. She is of Punjabi descent and belongs to a Sikh family. She loved to act and sing, and dreamt to be an actor since childhood.

She did her schooling from Dalhousie Hilltop School, Dalhousie and completed her graduation from Lovely Professional University, Phagwara, and has a degree in commerce.

Career

Gill began her career by featuring in "Shiv Di Kitaab" in 2015. Gill appeared in "Majhe Di Jatti" and "Pindaan Diyan Kudiyaan" in 2016. Gill's another music video came with Garry Sandhu titled Yeah Baby Refix. Gill also starred in some Punjabi films such as Sat Shri Akaal England in 2017, Kala Shah Kala and Daaka in 2019.

In September 2019, Gill entered as a celebrity participant on Bigg Boss 13. While she was in the Bigg Boss house, her first single, "Veham" came out, followed by some other singles including "Sidewalk", "Range" and "Ronda Ali Peti". The season ended in February 2020, where Gill finished up as second runner-up. In February 2020, she appeared in Mujhse Shaadi Karoge but it terminated within a month because of the COVID-19 pandemic.

Gill then appeared in a number of music videos including "Bhula Dunga", "Keh Gayi Sorry", "Kurta Pajama", "Waada Hai", "Shona Shona" and "Fly". 

In 2021, Gill appeared in Punjabi film Honsla Rakh opposite Diljit Dosanjh.

Filmography

Films

Television

Guest appearances

Music videos

Discography

See also 
 List of Indian film actresses

References

External links

 

1993 births
Living people
Actresses in Hindi television
Actresses in Hindi cinema
Indian women singers
Bigg Boss (Hindi TV series) contestants
21st-century Indian actresses
Actresses from Punjab, India
Female models from Punjab, India
Punjabi singers